Erich Paul Schwandt (born July 26, 1935 in San Luis Obispo, California – 2 August 2017 in Victoria, British Columbia) was a Canadian cembalist, organist, musicologist and music educator.

Schwandt studied harpsichord with Putnam Aldrich and gave harpsichord and organ concerts on CBC, throughout Canada and the USA. He taught music history and musicology at the Stanford University and the Eastman School of Music. His particular academic interest was the relationship between music and dance in the 17th and 18th centuries, and he published articles in publications such as Musical Quarterly, Notes, Fontes Artis Musicae, Canadian University Music Review and The New Grove. He created more than a dozen music editions and reconstructed the Gloria from Erik Satie's Messe des pauvres for a performance at the University of Victoria in 1997.

References

External links 
 University of Victoria - Erich Schwandt
 Obituary for Erich P. Schwandt
 Rodney Sharman: In Memoriam Erich Schwandt on Canadian Music Center
 Remembering Erich Schwandt
 University of Victoria - Day in the life: Dr. Erich Schwandt
 

1935 births
2017 deaths
Canadian classical organists
Male classical organists
Canadian musicologists
Canadian music educators
Academic staff of the University of Victoria
20th-century classical musicians
20th-century Canadian male musicians
People from San Luis Obispo, California